The Paris point is a unit of length defined as . It is commonly used for shoe sizes in Continental Europe.

The unit was invented by French shoemakers in the early 1800s. Its origin probably lies in  centimetre being very close to  inch; a French inch  is around 27 mm, a quarter of that is 6.7 mm, close to 6. mm defined for the Paris point.

See also
 Point (disambiguation)
 Barleycorn (unit), used in the English shoe sizing system.

References

Units of length